The 1990 IIHF European U18 Championship was the twenty-third playing of the IIHF European Junior Championships.

Group A
Played April 4–11, 1990 in Örnsköldsvik and Sollefteå, Sweden.

First round 
Group 1

Group 2

Final round
Championship round

7th place

Switzerland was relegated to Group B for 1991.
Following the reunification of Germany, the Federal Republic of Germany ceased being referred to as West Germany and, starting in 1991, was simply referred to as Germany

Tournament Awards
Top Scorer   Vyacheslav Kozlov (19 points)
Top Goalie:  Rolf Wanhainen
Top Defenceman: Ivan Droppa
Top Forward:  Vyacheslav Kozlov

Group B
Played March 21–30, 1990 in Val Gardena, Italy.

Undefeated France was promoted to Group A for 1991.  Spain should have been relegated to Group C, however, their replacement East Germany did not exist by 1991 so the Spaniards stayed up in Group B.

Group C
Played March 8–11, 1990 in Sofia, Bulgaria.  East Germany, just a few months before reunification, won the tournament easily.  They had last participated in Group A in 1968.

No team was promoted; East Germany won the right to proceed to Group B, but did not exist by 1991.

References

Complete results

Junior
IIHF European Junior Championship tournament
International ice hockey competitions hosted by Sweden
Sports competitions in Örnsköldsvik
March 1990 sports events in Europe
April 1990 sports events in Europe
International ice hockey competitions hosted by Italy
International ice hockey competitions hosted by Bulgaria
1989–90 in Swedish ice hockey
1989–90 in Italian ice hockey
1989–90 in Bulgarian ice hockey
Sports competitions in Sofia
1990s in Sofia